The following lists events that happened during 2011 in Rwanda.

Incumbents 
 President: Paul Kagame 
 Prime Minister: Bernard Makuza (until 7 October), Pierre Habumuremyi (starting 7 October)

References

 
2010s in Rwanda
Years of the 21st century in Rwanda
Rwanda
Rwanda